John Picton Gorell Barnes, 5th Baron Gorell (born 29 July 1959), is a British Chartered Surveyor. In 1989 he married Rosanne Duncan – they have two children. He was educated at King's School, Bruton, Somerset, England. and at the Cornwall Technical College, Camborne, Cornwall, England. Barnes is a liveryman of the Worshipful Company of Weavers and is also a Freeman of the City of London. He lives in Northamptonshire.

He succeeded in the barony upon the death of his uncle, Timothy Barnes, 4th Baron Gorell, in 2007.

See also
Baron Gorell

References

  

Barons in the Peerage of the United Kingdom
1959 births
British surveyors
People educated at Cornwall College
People educated at King's School, Bruton
Living people
People from Northamptonshire